|}

The Jewson Handicap Chase is a Premier Handicap National Hunt race in Great Britain. It is a handicap steeplechase and is run at Cheltenham Racecourse in November, over a distance of about 3 miles and 3½ furlongs (3 miles 3 furlongs and 71 yards, or 5,496 metres).

History
From 1987 to 1998 the race was known as the Flowers Original Handicap Chase. The 1999 running was known as the Hoegaarden Handicap Chase. From 2000 to 2002 it was sponsored by Intervet and known as the Intervet Trophy. The 2003 race was run under the name of the Open Trophy. The race was sponsored by Servo from 2004 to 2009, Morson Group in 2010 and Rewards4Racing in 2011. In 2012 it was renamed the Henrietta Knight Handicap Chase in honour of Henrietta Knight, a recently retired trainer whose training successes included winning three Cheltenham Gold Cups with Best Mate. From 2013 to 2015 the race was sponsored by the Murphy Group.

Records since 1987
Most successful horse:
 Stormez – (2002, 2004)

Leading jockey (4 wins):
 Tony McCoy – Evangelica (1996), Hanakham (1999), Innox (2005), Galaxy Rock (2011)

Leading trainer (4 wins):
 Martin Pipe – Evangelica (1996), Hanakham (1999), Stormez (2002, 2004)
 Widest winning margin – Joe Lively (2008) – 14 lengths
 Narrowest winning margin – Hati Roy (2001), My Will (2006), Galant Nuit (2009) – ½ length
 Most runners – 16, in 2005
 Fewest runners – 4, in 1992 and 1996

Winners since 1987

See also
 Horse racing in Great Britain
 List of British National Hunt races

References

 Racing Post:

National Hunt races in Great Britain
National Hunt chases
Cheltenham Racecourse